α-Chaconine is a steroidal glycoalkaloid that occurs in plants of the family Solanaceae. It is a natural toxicant produced in green potatoes and gives the potato a bitter taste. Tubers produce this glycoalkaloid in response to stress, providing the plant with insecticidal and fungicidal properties. It belongs to the chemical family of saponins. Since it causes physiological effects on individual organism, chaconine is considered to be defensive allelochemical. Solanine is a related substance that has similar properties.

Symptoms and treatment 
These are similar to symptoms from ingesting solanine. There are a wide variety of symptoms including: abdominal pain, diarrhea, headache etc.

There is no medicine for detoxification but if it is just after consumption, taking laxative or Gastric lavage could be effective. The symptoms could last several days.

Toxicity 

The presence of more than 20 mg/100g tuber glycoalkaloids is toxic for humans.

There have been instances of fatal poisoning cases from potatoes with high glycoalkaloid content. However, such cases are rare.

Some research shows teratogenic effects on humans, but epidemiological investigations have produced conflicting research, as well.
Levels of glycoalkaloids most likely differ by cultivar, storage conditions (especially exposure to sunlight), and processing techniques.

Difference between Chaconine and Solanine

Structural difference 

Although α-chaconine and α-solanine are both derived from solanidine, the difference appears in 3 groups attached to the terminal oxygen in solanidine. For α-chaconine, these groups are one -glucose and two -rhamnose whereas in α-solanine, they are -galactose, -glucose, and -rhamnose.

Difference in Toxicity 

In an experiment demonstrating the feeding-inhibition effect of solanine and chaconine on snails, chaconine had a greater effect than solanine. However, a mixture of chaconine and solanine had a synergistic effect. The mixture had a significantly higher effect of deterred feeding than using solanine and chaconine on their own.

Ratio of ɑ-chaconine to ɑ-solanine in potato 

On average, it is between 1.2 and 2.6 to 1, meaning the amount of ɑ-chaconine is greater than ɑ-solanine. However, the average ratio for the peel was 2.0 whereas that for the flesh was nearly 1.5. Also, the ratio was not consistent and depended on cultivar, growth condition, and method of storage.

Research on Glycoalkaloids

Controlling Amount of Steroidal Glycoalkaloids in Potato 

In 2014, a research group in Japan, from Institute of Physical and Chemical Research (or RIKEN) found genes for enzymes that are involved in the synthesis of cholesterol, cycloartanol, and related steroidal glycoalkaloids (SGAs), SSR2. Since SGAs are biosynthesized from cholesterol, restricting those enzymes could reduce the amount of the SGAs in potato.

Level of glycoalkaloids 
The research shows which process of treating potatoes affects the amount of glycoalkaloids (containing both solanine and chaconine more than 90%). The research did four processes which are boiling, baking, frying, and microwaving. As a result, it appears to be frying peel has the largest amount of glycoalkaloids (139–145 mg/100g of product) whereas others contained the average amount of 3 mg/100g product (See the original article for detailed values).

In another research, it showed the amount of SGAs is unaffected by baking, boiling, and frying. This research also shows very high level of SGAs with non-peeleed potato tubers (200 mg kg^-1 FM).

In 2004, there was the research that investigate the change of the amount of α-chaconine and α-solanine over time (90 days). The result showed how the amount of both α-chaconine and α-solanine did not change significantly if it is kept in cold and dark place. The amount actually varied by little but the research concluded that it is due to the cultivar.

The Analytical procedure for this experiment: Take 5 g of sample and homogenize with 15ml of methanol, then filter and make 50 ml of sample extract solution with methanol. Mix 5ml of sample with 12ml of water. Eluate by using Sep-Pak Plus C18 cartridge. Then dry and mix residue with 1ml of methanol and test the solution by HLPC.

Treating poisons in potato 
Peels and  sprouts usually contain high level of SGAs. There are relatively larger amount if tuber is exposed in sunlight. If tubers are not mature enough, those might contain high level of chaconine and solanine. Thus, sprouts on potato and peels should be removed and if there is the green part inside potato, it should be removed as well. 
It should be preserved in dark and cold place, but it does not have to be in the fridge. It is likely to germinate or degrade when the surrounding is above 20℃. As it is mentioned in earlier chapter, heating might not be very effective towards SGAs, therefore, those contain high level of SGAs should be carefully removed.
Also, if potato is kept in fridge, it increases the amount of sugar. And when cooking (such as frying, baking), the toxic compound called acrylamide formed when sugar and amino acids react.

When cooking potato, if it is fried at 210℃ for 10 minutes, the amount of solanine and chaconine decreased to 60% of it original amount. If it is fried at 170℃ for 5 minutes, there was no significant change in the amount of solanine and chaconine. But if it is fried for 15 minutes at the same temperature, solanine decreased 76.1% and chaconine decomposed 81.5%. Thus, the break down of solanine and chaconine are considered to start around 170℃.
In one research, the solution containing α-solanine and α-chaconine is put into boiled water for 150 minutes, there was no significant decrease in the amount of solanine and chaconine. Therefore, it can be considered that boiling potato is not effective to reduce the amount of solanine and chaconine.

Also, since glycoalkaloids are soluble in water, it is one of ways to put potato into water for a while so that SGAs dissolve into water.

Attempt to make toxin-free potato 
Research was launched in 2015 attempting to make potatoes with no glycoalkaloids by genome editing. 
Because glycoalkaloids heavily affects human health it is necessary to test for the amount present in potatoes, an expense that would be saved if a glycoalkaloid free potato were available, in addition to being a more healthful food.

Part of the research involves trying to determine what advantage potatoes achieve from producing glycoalkaloids.  Research has been published suggesting there is little benefits potatoes from the production, though other research questions that conclusion.

See also 
 Solamargine

References

External links

Steroidal alkaloids
Alkaloid glycosides
Saponins
Plant toxins
Steroidal alkaloids found in Solanaceae